Feng Tian (born February 12, 1992), also known as Win Feng, is a Japanese actor, singer and model. He is a member of the Taiwanese boyband SpeXial since 2015.

Biography 
Tian was born in Aomori Prefecture, Japan on February 12, 1992. He began his career as a model and participated in many international fashion shows. In the second half of 2014, he joined the Taiwanese boy band SpeXial alongside two other new members. He debuted in SpeXial under the English name of "Win" on January 13, 2015. In the group, he performs as vocalist.

As an actor, he is best known for his roles in web series like Men with Sword, KO One Re-member and KO One Re-call.

Filmography

Television

Web series

Movies

References

External links 
  Official web site

1992 births
Living people
Taiwanese male television actors
21st-century Taiwanese male actors
21st-century Taiwanese  male singers
Taiwanese pop singers
Taiwanese idols
Japanese expatriates in Taiwan